The Musgrave Medal is an annual award by the Institute of Jamaica in recognition of achievement in art, science, and literature. Originally conceived in 1889 and named in memory of Sir Anthony Musgrave, the founder of the Institute and the former Governor of Jamaica who had died the previous year, the medal was the first to be awarded in the Western Hemisphere.

The medals were initially awarded as prizes in a cultural competition. In 1941 the Gold Medal was initiated and awarded in recognition of a "distinguished eminence". The first recipient of the gold medal was artist Edna Manley in recognition of her work promoting art and literature. A Silver Medal, recognizing "outstanding merit", and Bronze Medal, for merit, are also awarded.

The medal was designed by British sculptor Alfred Toft. The first medal was awarded in 1897, as part of Jamaica's celebrations of Queen Victoria's Diamond Jubilee. Until 1906 the medals were only given as prizes in art and craft competitions organised by the Institute.

In 2011, eight Musgrave Medals were awarded, with a gold medal for Hedley Jones, designer and builder of Jamaica's first solid body electric guitar in 1940, and builder of audio equipment including some of Jamaica's early sound systems and much of the equipment in Studio One.

Gold Medal winners
2022: Lenford Salmon, theater and culture; Joy Spence, chemist and master blender; Diana McCaulay, author and environmental activist
2021: Ishion Hutchinson, literature, Mona Webber, science, Steven Woodham, music;
2019: Michael Bucknor, academia; Winston Ewart, music
2018: Peter Ashbourne, music; Basil Burke, science; Mervyn Morris, literature
2017: Herbert Ho Ping Kong, science
2016: No medals awarded
2015: Sly and Robbie, music; Orlando Patterson, literature
2014: Anthony C. Winkler, literature; Petrona Morrison, education; Celia Christie-Samuels, medical research
2013: Lee “Scratch” Perry, music; Franklin W. Knight, social history 
2012: Horace Fletcher, medical science; Edward Baugh, poetry and scholarship 
2011: Hedley Jones, music and audio engineering
2010: Terrence Forrester, science
2009: Wycliffe Bennett, arts development; Maureen Warner-Lewis, literature
2008: Carey Robinson, community development & heritage; Mercedes Richards, astronomy
2007: Mystic Revelation of Rastafari, development of Jamaican music; Bertram Fraser-Reid, chemistry
2006: Kamau Brathwaite, literature
2005: Richard Hart, history
2004: Olive Senior, documenting Jamaican heritage; Mico College, recognizing the importance of Jamaican culture
2003: Chris Blackwell, development of Jamaican music; Franklyn Prendergast, medicine
2002: David Pottinger, art; Clement Seymore 'Sir Coxsone' Dodd, music
2001: Hon. Lawson Douglas, urology
2000: Monty Alexander, music; Basil Barrington Watson, art ; University Singers, music	
1999: Erna Brodber, literature ; Errol Morrison, medical science ; Lorna Goodison, poetry
1998: Jamaica Library Service, literature ; University of the West Indies
1997: No gold medal awarded 
1996: Sir Roy Augier, Caribbean education history; Stuart Hall, sociological studies
1995: David Boxer, art through institution building and scholarship; Graham Roger Serjeant, medical science; John Golding, medical science
1994: Peter Abrahams, fiction and journalism ; Manley West, pharmacology
1993: No gold medal awarded 
1989–92: Osmond Watson, art; Barry Higman, history; Gerald Lalor, science: Robert Hill, history
1988: Alfred Sangster, science and technical education ; Trevor Rhone, drama ; Clive Thompson, dance
1987: Olive Lewin, music ; Carl Abrahams, art ; Francis Nicholas, dance
1986: Derek Walcott, literature ; Kenneth E.N. Ingram, librarianship and history scholarship
1985: Mallica 'Kapo' Reynolds, painting and sculpture
1984: Cecil A. Baugh, ceramics
1983: Frederic G. Cassidy, philology and etymology
1982: Clinton Black, history (archival development)
1981: Rex Nettleford, dance and West Indian cultural development 
1980: George Proctor, botany
1979: No gold medal awarded
1978: Louise Bennett, poetry and theatre
1977: Alicia Alonso, artistic excellence ; Ronald Moody, sculpture
1976: Victor Stafford Reid, literature
1975: Little Theatre Movement, theatre
1974: Nicolas Guillen, literature ; Albert Huie, art
1973: No gold medal awarded
1972: M. G. Smith, anthropology
1971: Amy Jacques Garvey, history
1970: Alvin Marriott, sculpture
1969: Ansel Hart, history
1968: Roger Mais, literature, posthumously
1967: No gold medal awarded 
1966: Phillip Sherlock, history and literature
1965: Theodore E. Sealy, cultural development
1959–64: No gold medals awarded 
1958: J.E. Clare McFarlane, poetry
1955–57: No gold medals awarded 
1954: W. Adolphe Roberts, history literature
1952–53: No gold medals awarded 
1951: George Goode, music
1944–50: No gold medals awarded 
1943: Ena Ada Josephine, art and literature
1942: No gold medal awarded
1941: Edna Manley, art and literature (first award)

References

 
Civil awards and decorations of Jamaica
Visual arts awards
Awards established in 1889
1889 establishments in Jamaica